Bessancourt is a commune in the Val-d'Oise department in Île-de-France in northern France. Bessancourt station has rail connections to Persan, Saint-Leu-la-Forêt and Paris.

Population

Twin Towns
Bessancourt is twinned with:
 Holmes Chapel, Cheshire, United Kingdom since 1979

See also
Communes of the Val-d'Oise department

References

External links
Official website 

Association of Mayors of the Val d'Oise 

Communes of Val-d'Oise